Andrena jessicae is a species of mining bee in the family Andrenidae. It is found in Central America and North America. This species is named after Jessie E. Casad, a co-author of Cockerell.

References

Further reading

 
 

jessicae
Articles created by Qbugbot
Insects described in 1896
Hymenoptera of North America